The BYU Cougars women's soccer represents Brigham Young University in the Big 12 Conference of NCAA Division I soccer. Prior to the 1995 season, the team participated as a club sport. The team is coached by Jennifer Rockwood and has made the NCAA Tournament 23 times, reaching the Quarterfinals of the College Cup four times in 2003, 2012, 2019 and 2021. The team plays its home games at South Field on the university campus.

History
From its founding until 1995 the BYU Cougars women's soccer club participated in the Western National Collegiate Club soccer Association (NCCSA). Twice during that stretch they made the NSCAA Championship, in 1993 and 1994. Jennifer Rockwood coached the BYU Women's soccer club for seven seasons before they joined the NCAA in 1995. Since joining the NCAA, BYU has consistently been ranked in the top 25. In 23 of the 28 years they have qualified for the NCAA Tournament. To date the Cougars have produced 38 All-Americans.

Results by season

Notable alumni 
Aleisha Cramer
Lindsi Cutshall
Nádia Gomes
Ashley Hatch
Katie Larkin
Shauna Rohbock
Michele Vasconcelos

References

External links